Combatwoundedveteran (also written as Combat Wounded Veteran) was a grindcore/screamo band split between Ithaca, New York and Tampa, Florida. In their 7 years of existence they managed to put out several splits, including one with heavily influential screamo band Orchid, a 10" EP, one full-length album and a posthumous release that compiles nearly all their splits and early EPs. Though the band did not tour very often or put out many records their footprint is still visible in the screamo and powerviolence underground.  The band was signed to famous Florida record label No Idea Records late in their career. Guitarist Chris Norris currently does graphic design under the name Steak Mtn. and has contributed artwork for releases by groups such as  Atom And His Package, Orchid and Against Me!.

The group's music was heavily influenced by the early grindcore sound, math rock and powerviolence.

Members
Dan Ponch – vocals, bass (1996-2002)
Jason Hamacher – drums (2000-2002)
Jeff Howe – bass (1996-2002)
Chris Norris – guitar, vocals (1996-2002)
Dan Radde – guitar, vocals (1999-2002)
Mark Muenchinger - drums (1996-2000)
Billy Frank – guitar (1999-2000)

Discography

Studio albums
 I Know a Girl Who Develops Crime Scene Photos (1999, No Idea)

EPs
 11 Song 7" (1997, Suppose I Break Your Neck Records)
 What Flavor Is Your Death Squad Leader? (1998, Schematics Records)
 Split 6" (1999, Clean Plate Records; Split w/ Orchid) 
 Combatwoundedveteran/Scrotum Grinder (1999, Burrito Records; Split w/ Scrotum Grinder)
 Electric Youth Crew (2002, Schematics Records; Split w/ Reversal of Man)
 Duck Down for the Torso (2002, No Idea Records)

Compilation albums
 This Is Not an Erect, Red Neon Body (2004, No Idea)

References

Hardcore punk groups from Florida
Musical groups established in 1996
Musical groups disestablished in 2003
Powerviolence groups
American grindcore musical groups
American screamo musical groups